Scott Tennant is an American classical guitarist. Tennant is a founding member of the Grammy Award-winning Los Angeles Guitar Quartet.

Early life and education 
Born in Detroit, Michigan in March 1962, Tennant began his musical and guitar studies at the age of six. He attended Cass Technical High School in Detroit, where he also studied violin and trombone. Having played the former in the Cass Tech Symphony Orchestra and the latter in the Cass Tech Concert Band, Tennant graduated in the class of 1980.

Tennant was admitted into the school of music of the University of Southern California in 1980, and studied there until 1986. Having won silver medals in both the Toronto International Guitar Competition in 1984 and the Paris Radio France Competition in 1988, Tennant won the gold medal in the Tokyo International Competition as 1989's first-place finisher.

Career

Academia 
Tennant taught guitar at the San Francisco Conservatory of Music from 1989–1993, and has since been on the faculty of the USC Thornton School of Music. Tennant also sits on the faculty of the Pasadena Conservancy of Music.

Awards and nominations

Solo 
 Toronto International Guitar Competition, silver medal, 1984
 Paris Radio France Competition, silver medal, 1988
 Tokyo International Competition, gold medal, 1989

Los Angeles Guitar Quartet 
 Latin, Grammy Award nomination, 2003
 Guitar Heroes, Grammy Award, Best Classical Crossover, 2005

References

External links
Interview www.lacg.net (December, 2002)
Video Interview with Scott Tennant (October 2009)

1962 births
American classical guitarists
American male guitarists
Grammy Award winners
Living people
USC Thornton School of Music alumni
San Francisco Conservatory of Music faculty
USC Thornton School of Music faculty
Guitarists from California
Guitarists from Detroit
20th-century American guitarists
Classical musicians from California
Classical musicians from Michigan
20th-century American male musicians